Mehdi El Idrissi (born 1977 in Casablanca) is a Moroccan businessman.

Career
Mehdi started his career in 2002 within the Family Group Kettani in Morocco, as the CEO of the newly created Ekman Converting Group, a joint venture with the Swedish Ekman & Co. He then accompanied the restructuring of the Kettani Group (a company involved in processing and paper wadding of cellulose and real estate), serving as CFO and operating in North and West Africa (including Algeria, Morocco, Ivory Coast, Mali and Senegal).

From 2010 to 2015, Mehdi was CEO of MEDI BUSINESS JET, a jet company operating from Morocco and covering Africa, Europe and the Middle East.

At Eurosearch & Associés, from 2015 to 2019 he was the Partner in charge of Africa and Middle East In this role, he supported the development of businesses in all sectors and investment funds in Morocco, in sub-Saharan Africa and more generally in the MENA region.

He is now the Managing Director of ALIDES Africa a member of ECI Group.

Other roles 
He has been a member of the Board of Moroccan Business Association. As head of the Offset Commission he worked on the law implementing the Public Private Partnerships in Morocco.

He is also a member of the Confluence Club of CEPS, an independent think tank founded in 1985.

In the humanitarian field, Mehdi El Idrissi is a member of the associations "Coup de pouce humanitaire", "Autremonde" and "#Leplusimportant".

Awards and education 
In 2010, he received the Chevalier de l’Ordre du Mérite from the King of Morocco

Mehdi is an International Visitor Leadership Program alumni, having been selected for the Entrepreneurship and Business Management program following President Barack Obama's A New Beginning speech in Cairo.

References

Living people
1977 births
Moroccan chief executives
Moroccan civil servants
Moroccan expatriates in France
Idrisid dynasty